The Lounge Ax was a music venue in the Lincoln Park neighborhood of Chicago, located across the street from Wax Trax. It was an important venue for live rock music, especially indie rock. The club was opened in 1987 by Jennifer Fischer and Julia Adams, who were joined around September 1989 by Sue Miller, previously the booker at two other Chicago clubs, West End and the Cubby Bear. For most of the club's existence, it was owned by Adams and Miller.

The band Phish played their first performance ever in the state of Illinois at Lounge Ax on March 30, 1990.

Miller married her husband, musician Jeff Tweedy, at the Lounge Ax in August 1995. The ceremony was conducted by a waitress at the club named Lana Levins, who was also an ordained minister.

In 1996, Touch & Go Records released a compilation album to benefit the club, titled The Lounge Ax Defense & Relocation Compact Disc, featuring artists such as Guided by Voices, The Jesus Lizard, Sebadoh, Tortoise, The Coctails and Yo La Tengo.

Lounge Ax was featured prominently in the Chicago-based movie High Fidelity, released in 2000. The club served as the site where John Cusack's character, Rob Gordon, and the staff from Championship Vinyl first encounter Marie DeSalle, played by Lisa Bonet. Its location across from the Biograph Theater plays an important part in the dialogue leading up to the Lounge Ax scenes.

On January 15, 2000, the final show at Lounge Ax was headlined by The Coctails (who reunited for the occasion), with Dianogah and M.O.T.O. opening.

References

Music venues in Chicago
Nightclubs in Chicago
Music venues completed in 1987
2000 disestablishments in Illinois
Former music venues in the United States